Sai Baba or Saibaba ("Swami", and  , "Baba") is an honorific term for ascetics in India. It may refer to:

People
 Sai Baba of Shirdi (–1918), Indian guru
 Sathya Sai Baba (1926–2011), born Sathya Narayana Raju, Indian guru
 G. N. Saibaba (born 1967), Indian scholar and activist

Religion
 Shirdi Sai Baba movement
 Sathya Sai Baba movement

Media
 Shirdi Ke Sai Baba, a 1977 Indian film
 Sai Baba (TV series), a 2005 Indian TV series